Aleš Puš (born 2 August 1979) is a Slovenian retired football defender.

He has played for Olimpija, Gorica, Luka Koper and Celje.

References

1979 births
Living people
Slovenian footballers
Slovenian expatriate footballers
Ethnikos Achna FC players
NK Celje players
FC Koper players
ND Gorica players
Slovenian PrvaLiga players
Cypriot First Division players
Expatriate footballers in Cyprus
Association football defenders